Julius Elias (12 July 1861 – 2 July 1927) was a German art historian, literary historian and translator.

He was born in Hoya and died in Berlin. his parents were Louis Juda Elias and Helene Elias. He was a lecturer in art history at the Technische Hochschule Charlottenburg, and also an art collector. As an art critic he favored Impressionism. In literature, he is among other known as a co-publisher of German translations of Henrik Ibsen (14 volumes, 1898-1909) and Bjørnstjerne Bjørnson (4 volumes, 1911).

Elias married Julie Levy, a successful author, in 1888. 

With his wife, Juliane (Julie), Elias had a son, Ludwig Elias (1891–1942 also known as Dr. Karl Ludwig Elias), who was murdered by the Nazis at Auschwitz.

Art collector 
Among the paintings in Elias' collection was Monet's Garden at Giverny, which Galerie Aktuaryus sold to the Emil Georg Bührle in 1941 (inv 72).

References

External links
 
 

Academic staff of the Technical University of Berlin
German art historians
German art critics
German literary historians
German translators
Norwegian–German translators
Henrik Ibsen researchers
1861 births
1927 deaths
German male dramatists and playwrights
19th-century German dramatists and playwrights
19th-century German male writers
20th-century German dramatists and playwrights